The Dark Forest is a 2008 science fiction novel by the Chinese writer Liu Cixin.  It is the sequel to the Hugo Award-winning novel  The Three-Body Problem in the trilogy titled Remembrance of Earth's Past, but Chinese readers generally refer to the series by the title of the first novel. The English version, translated by Joel Martinsen, was published in 2015. The novel's title comes from the dark forest hypothesis, coined by Liu in the novel, but described by astronomer and author David Brin as early as 1983, by Stanisław Lem in "The New Cosmogony" (from his book A Perfect Vacuum, 1971) as a possible solution to the Fermi paradox and by Greg Bear in 1987 in his novel The Forge of God.

Plot
The UN forms the Planetary Defense Council (PDC) to coordinate defensive efforts against the impending assault of the Trisolarans, who have launched a massive invasion fleet that will reach Earth in around 400 years. However, subatomic semi-artificial intelligences sent from Trisolaris (the book's name for the three-star system of Alpha Centauri), known as sophons, have already reached Earth; these conduct surveillance of national secrets and private conversations, and disrupt the operation of particle accelerators in order to obstruct any new discoveries in fundamental physics until the fleet arrives. 

Since the sophons cannot read minds, the PDC decides that, in addition to regular military expansion, there will be four people appointed as Wallfacers. They are granted access to the resources of the UN and shall develop and direct strategic plans only known to themselves in order to keep them secret from the enemy. As a result, this also requires them to misdirect and deceive the human world; they therefore do not need to give any explanation for their actions and commands, no matter how incomprehensible they may be. Three Wallfacers are chosen on the basis of merit: Frederick Tyler, a former United States Secretary of Defense; Manuel Rey Diaz, former president of Venezuela and a nuclear engineer; and Bill Hines, former president of the EU and a neuroscientist. To general surprise, the fourth Wallfacer is announced to be Luo Ji, an obscure Chinese professor of sociology who is lazy and un-ambitious. 

The story reveals that Luo was chosen because Trisolaris, for unknown reasons, sees him as a threat, and ordered the Earth-Trisolaris Organization (ETO) to assassinate him. In retaliation, Trisolaris appoints three ETO members to be Wallbreakers. They are to spy on Tyler, Rey Diaz, and Hines respectively, to discover and ruin their strategies. Meanwhile, a PLAN officer, Zhang Beihai, is inducted into China's new Space Force; he displays an unwavering hope of victory, and blames the other officers for their defeatism. Zhang secretly murders some scientists advocating chemical propulsion, so research into non-media radiation drives and controlled fusion engines receives priority. His proposal to enter hibernation for the purpose of fighting defeatism among future generations is approved.

Tyler designs a swarm of small, nuclear-equipped kamikaze space-fighters, but his secret plan to work with the ETO to double-cross Earth's forces, and subsequently to triple-cross the Trisolarans, is published by his Wallbreaker. (The Chinese original of the book has a different plan for Tyler involving ball lightning and macro fusion weapons.) His wish to be denounced as a war criminal by the UN to break free of the status as a Wallfacer is ignored because of the latter, driving him to suicide. 

Rey Diaz requests funding for massive nuclear warheads, and detonates one on Mercury, but his secret plan is also exposed by his Wallbreaker: to build a nuclear mechanism able to propel Mercury into the sun, which would lead to coronal mass ejection consuming the rest of the solar system, and then using it to threaten Trisolaris with mutually assured destruction. At the next PDC hearing, the USA decides to violate his diplomatic immunity and arrest him, but Rey Diaz escapes by pretending to hold a dead man's switch which can destroy New York City. Returning to Venezuela, he is reviled by the populace as a war criminal, and stoned to death by an angry mob. 

Hines conducts experiments to amplify intelligence, in the process discovering a means of implanting beliefs. The UN allows soldiers to use Hines's device to implant faith in victory against Trisolaris as a controversial means of curbing defeatism. Hines decides to enter hibernation; while he is asleep, the program is terminated as a crime against humanity.  

Luo refuses to work, instead using his power as a Wallfacer to live in luxury. He asks Shi Qiang (the detective with Wang Miao in the previous novel, now working as a security officer on the Wallfacer project) to find a woman whose description matches an ideal woman in his dreams, leading Shi to find Zhuang Yan. Zhuang comes to live with Luo, eventually marrying him and giving birth to a daughter, Xia Xia. After five years of living together, Zhuang acts on a plan put in place before she was found by Shi. She and Xia Xia go into hibernation until the predicted time of arrival of the Trisolaran fleet, to force Luo to develop a method of stopping the fleet if he wishes to live peacefully with her again. Desperate to find a way to protect Zhuang and Xia Xia, Luo reflects on a conversation of many years ago with his former teacher, Ye Wenjie, the founder of the ETO, and realizes certain truths about galactic civilizations. Accordingly, Luo arranges for the location of a star 49.5 light-years away to be broadcast throughout the galaxy, using the sun as an amplifier. He enters hibernation, asking to be awoken after an effect on the star is noticed. Four years later, an observatory notices through the tracking of space dust the Trisolaran fleet had launched swift probes on that exact day, forecast to reach Earth in merely 200 years.

Luo, Hines, and Hines's wife Keiko Yamasuki wake up 200 years later to a wealthier, more advanced society, albeit without any advancements in particle physics and supercomputing due to the ongoing sophon sabotage. The Earth now has thousands of spaceships larger and faster than Trisolaris's one thousand ships. The ETO has been eliminated. The UN is confident of victory, and writes off the old Wallfacer project as an absurdity. Yamasuki reveals she was the last Wallbreaker, and exposes the secret part of Hines's plan: the belief implanting device was inverted, causing its subjects to believe victory was impossible and to conspire to escape the Earth. 

The human space fleet, worried that the device has produced a secret society of escape advocates, brings Zhang out of hibernation to investigate. Zhang seizes the moment to sedate the largest ship's crew, and drive the ship out of the solar system as a secret defeatist all along. The space fleet sends four ships after Zhang. Meanwhile, the first Trisolaran probe passes Jupiter, and in a show of strength, humanity launches 2,000 warships to intercept it. However, the probe unexpectedly re-activates and rams into humanity's assembled warships, piercing their fuel cells with ease because it is constructed of an ultra-strong material held together directly by the strong interaction. Due to the massive debris field generated by the high-velocity collisions and resultant thermonuclear chain reactions, only two warships manage to escape into deep space, and their crews decide to flee the system rather than return.

Hearing of the defeat, society on Earth suffers mass hysteria. The four warship crews pursuing Zhang decide to join him. However, each crew eventually concludes that they can maximize their chances of reaching distant star systems by killing the other crews and stripping their ships of resources, with only one ship emerging victorious. On the other side of the solar system, one of the two escaping ships also kills the other's crew. Luo explains these events confirm his earlier theory: there is life everywhere in the galaxy, but owing to exponential growth and limited resources, the incentive is very high for each galactic civilization to preemptively kill any others. The only thing stopping this is the lack of knowledge of others' locations, explaining the Fermi paradox. 

Luo is made a Wallfacer again after the UN notices the star marked by Luo was destroyed, ostensibly by a near-light-speed relativistic mass sent by a belligerent, hyper-advanced civilization. His strategy was to force Trisolaris into a truce by threatening to broadcast their location. However, the Trisolarans prevent this by using their probe to blanket Earth with electromagnetic interference at one of the Earth's Lagrange points. Luo seemingly gives up and joins the government agents in their Snow Project, a futile effort to use nuclear bombs to create vast clouds of debris to track the remaining journey of Trisolaris's fleet. He is shunned by the public for not having a plan to defeat Trisolaris, and descends into alcoholism. However, he encoded a message into the bombs: upon their explosion, the resulting precisely-placed dust clouds will cause the sun to appear to flicker to an extra-solar observer, thereby relaying Trisolaris's location to the galaxy in a type of Morse code. Trisolaris is forced into a truce with Earth, diverting its colonization fleet and yielding to humanity the ability to produce gravitational wave transmitters. 

In the epilogue, the government agents approve of Luo's work and agree to bring his wife and daughter out of hibernation, whereupon they are reunited. Luo converses briefly with the pacifist Trisolaran who had made first contact with Ye Wenjie and who suggests that seeds of love might be present in other areas of the universe.

Characters

 Ye Wenjie (叶文洁) – Astrophysicist who initiated initial contact between Earth and Trisolaris. Spiritual leader of the Earth Trisolaris Organization. 
 Mike Evans (麦克·伊文斯) – ETO financial backer and key leader, killed in previous book.
 Wu Yue (吴岳) – Captain in the PLA Navy
 Zhang Beihai (章北海) – Political commissar in the PLA Navy. Assassinates proponents of media-drive research in order to guarantee the development of plasma drives. Appointed acting commander of Natural Selection due to a screening of fleet officers for use of the "mental seal", utilizes Natural Selection to escape the Solar System.
 Chang Weisi (常伟思) – General in the PLA and Zhang Beihai co-worker. First commander of humanity's space force and a defeatist who envies Zhang's Triumphalism.
 George Fitzroy – US General; coordinator at the Planetary Defense Council; military liaison to Hubble II project
 Albert Ringier – Hubble II astronomer
 Yang Jinwen (杨晋文) – Retired middle school teacher in Beijing
 Miao Fuqian – Shanxi coal boss; neighbor to Zhang and Yang
 Zhang Yuanchao (张援朝) – Recently retired chemical plant worker in Beijing.
 Shi Qiang (史强), also nicknamed Da Shi (大史) – Wallfacer Head of Security. Locates Luo Ji's wife for their initial meeting. Afflicted by leukemia and hibernates to the doomsday battle with Luo Ji where he saves his life multiple times from an assassin computer virus.
 Shi Xiaoming – Shi Qiang's son
 Kent (坎特) – Liaison to the PDC. Wallfacer Security Staff for Luo Ji. Despite best efforts at physically securing Luo Ji in an underground bunker, passes on Bed Flu bioweapon to Luo Ji. Dies of old age on Luo Ji's estate.
 Secretary General Say: Secretarial General of the United Nations, oversees the creation of the Wallfacer project and selects Luo Ji, gambling that his importance to Trisolaris might generate success for humanity. Attempts to create a Human Memorial Project to catalogue human culture, which is destroyed for being defeatist by the Planetary Defense Council.
 Keiko Yamasuki – Neuroscientist; Hines's wife
 Garanin – PDC rotating chair
 Ding Yi (丁仪) – Theoretical physicist
 Zhuang Yan (庄颜) – Graduate of the Central Academy of Fine Arts, Luo Ji's wife
 Ben Jonathan – Fleet Joint Conference special commissioner 
 Dongfang Yanxu (东方延绪) – Captain of space warship Natural Selection. Relieved of command due to a scan of fleet command for evidence of mental seal use, unable to prevent Zhang Beihai from taking complete control of the flagship and fleeing Earth. Attempts to initiate a first strike against the other vessels due to the conclusion that there are not supplies among the ships to make the interstellar journey. Killed by a faster first strike made by Ultimate Law.
 Major Xizi – Science officer of Quantum.

Wallfacers (面壁者)
 Frederick Tyler (弗雷德里克·泰勒) – Former US Secretary of Defense. Primary plan was to make a massive swarm of kamikaze fighter craft to combat the Trisolaran fleet. Secondary plan was to remotely control the fighter craft swarm to betray earth and transport a massive quantity of water to the incoming fleet. Tertiary plan was to take remote control of the swarm fleet to detonate hydrogen bombs directly on the enemy fleet ships once within range. Informed by his Wallbreaker that his plan would not have even scratched the fleet.  Unable to resign from Wallfacer status, he commits suicide.
 Manuel Rey Diaz (曼努尔·雷迪亚兹) – Former President of Venezuela. Primary plan was to develop more powerful hydrogen bombs to be used to combat the Trisolaran fleet. Secondary plan was to utilize these hydrogen bombs to slow down Mercury, resulting in a chain reaction where all planets in the Solar System are consumed by an expanding Sol. Blackmails the UN with fake nuclear bombs to revoke his Wallfacer status and return to Venezuela where he is promptly stoned to death by his own people for threatening the destruction of the Solar System.
 Bill Hines (比尔·希恩斯) – English neuroscientist and former president of the EU. Primary plan was to boost human intelligence to a high enough level to overcome the scientific block on particle physics by the sophons. Secondary plan was to instill an incorruptible state of defeatism in humanity's military, forcing humanity to develop plans to escape the solar system rather than stay and fight.
 Luo Ji (罗辑) – Astronomer and sociologist. Given the initial axioms of Dark Forest theory by Ye Wenjie. Is his own Wallbreaker when he concludes that the axioms result in the Dark Forest state of the universe, and thus the only strategic option against the Trisolarans is mutually assured destruction through broadcast of their interstellar coordinates.

Trilogy
The additional books in the Remembrance of Earth's Past trilogy are:

三体, (The Three-Body Problem) 2008; English translation by Ken Liu published by Tor Books in 2014
死神永生 (Death's End), 2010; English translation by Ken Liu published by Tor Books in 2016

Videos 
 Waterdrop, referring to the Trisolaran droplet probe, is a 14-minute tribute film produced by Wang Ren, who was then a graduate student studying Architecture in Columbia University. The author Liu Cixin commented, "This is the kind of film I have in mind. If the feeling of such an atmosphere can be delivered in a Three Body Problem film, I would rest in peace after I die."
 MC Three Body - The Dark Forest is an animation series produced by a group of Chinese fans. Initially a machinima series produced using the video game Minecraft, they later switched to using professional animation software. The series was released online at the beginning of 2018.
 A 3-part documentary series entitled Rendezvous with the Future which explores the science behind Liu Cixin’s science fiction was produced by BBC Studios and released by Bilibili in China in November 2022. The second episode covers many ideas featured in The Dark Forest such as the space elevator and artificial hibernation. An international version of the series has not yet been released.

See also
 Drake equation
 Superpredator interpretation of the Fermi paradox
 "Dangerous to communicate" interpretation of the Fermi paradox
 Search for extraterrestrial intelligence
 Hobbesian trap
 The Headquarters of the United Nations and the U.N. meditation room, play a major role in the plot

References

External links

2008 Chinese novels
2008 science fiction novels
Novels by Liu Cixin
Alien invasions in novels
Cryonics in fiction